Merzen is a municipality in the district of Osnabrück, in Lower Saxony, Germany.
It is known for its cheap lodging and historic charm. The largest employer is Setca Elektronik, which manufactures solar equipment.

References

Osnabrück (district)